Margaret Keswick Jencks (10 October 1941 – 8 July 1995) was a Scottish writer, artist and garden designer who co-founded Maggie's Centres with her husband Charles Jencks.

Early life 
Margaret Keswick was born at Cowhill Tower near Holywood in the county of Dumfriesshire in Scotland the only child of Sir John Keswick and Clare Elwes. Maggie's father was taipan of Jardine Matheson, the influential Scottish–Chinese trading company. The family spent time in Hong Kong and Shanghai as well as the UK. Keswick was educated in England and read English at Lady Margaret Hall, Oxford. After working in fashion, she studied at the Architectural Association in London.

Garden design and collaborations 
One of Maggie Jencks's main interests was in garden design. In 1978 she published The Chinese Garden: History, Art and Architecture. She collaborated with her husband on the design of the gardens at Portrack, their family home near Dumfries, Scotland, and on extensive alterations to the house's interior. Another major collaboration was couple's famous house in Notting Hill, London - open to the public from 2021 as the Cosmic House - designed with the architect Terry Farrell. Her other garden designs included one inspired by the pastoral poems of John Milton for the Jencks' house in California; a collaboration with the American architect Frank Gehry on the Lewis House at Cleveland, Ohio, where fibre-optics and running water created a highly original landscape; and a garden for the film director Roger Corman.

Career and legacy 
In 1978, she married as his second wife, Charles Jencks, writer and landscape artist, with whom she founded the first Maggie's Centres in Edinburgh, which opened in 1996.

A bust of Jencks is on display in the Hall of Heroes of the National Wallace Monument in Stirling.

Publications

References

1941 births
1995 deaths
20th-century British philanthropists
20th-century Scottish women artists
20th-century Scottish women writers
Alumni of Lady Margaret Hall, Oxford
British landscape and garden designers
Deaths from cancer in England
Maggie
People from Dumfries and Galloway
Scottish philanthropists